Madura United Football Club is an Indonesian professional football club. The club is based in Pamekasan, Madura, East Java. They currently play in the Liga 1. Established on 10 January 2016, Madura United FC is one of few professional clubs that succeeded in obtaining a license from AFC (Asian Football Confederation) for two years in a row.
Madura United FC currently plays in two stadiums; Gelora Bangkalan Stadium and Gelora Ratu Pamelingan Stadium.

History
On 10 January 2016, there was an agreement that involved the previous owner of Persipasi Bandung Raya, Ari Dewanto Sutedi, with Husodo Angkosubroto witnessed by the founder of Pelita Jaya, Nirwan Dermawan Bakrie that the ownership of Persipasi Bandung Raya (PBR) was taken over and moved to Madura. The name changed to Madura United. After the purchase, Madura United replaced PBR to perform in the 2016 Indonesia Soccer Championship A.

Name changes
 Pelita Jaya FC (1986–1999); home base in Lebak Bulus Stadium, Jakarta; known as Pelita Mastrans in 1997 and Pelita Bakrie between 1998 and 1999
 Pelita Solo (2000–02); home base in Manahan Stadium, Solo
 Pelita Krakatau Steel (2002–06); home base in Krakatau Steel Stadium, Cilegon
 Pelita Jaya Purwakarta (2006–07); home base in Lebak Bulus Stadium, Jakarta
 Pelita Jabar (2008–09); home base in Si Jalak Harupat Stadium, Bandung
 Pelita Jaya Karawang (2010–12); home base in Singaperbangsa Stadium, Karawang
 Pelita Bandung Raya (2012–2015); home base in Si Jalak Harupat Stadium, Bandung
 Persipasi Bandung Raya (2015); home base in Patriot Chandrabhaga Stadium, Bekasi
 Madura United FC (2016–present); home base in Gelora Ratu Pamelingan Stadium, Pamekasan

Kit suppliers
 Lotto (2010–2011)
 Umbro (2011–2012)
 Mitre (2012–14)
 MBB (2015–2016)
 Mizuno (2017)
 MBB (2018–2021)
 XTen (2021–)

Stadium

Madura United play their home matches at Gelora Bangkalan Stadium and Gelora Ratu Pamelingan Stadium.

Supporters
Their supporters were called "Taretan Dhibi", "Peccot Mania", "Trunojoyo Mania", and "K-Conk Mania".

Players

Current squad

Naturalized players

Out on loan

Continental record

Invitational tournament record

Honours

Domestic
as Pelita Jaya

League
 Galatama
 Champions (3): 1988–89, 1990, 1993–94
 Runners-up (2): 1986–87, 1987–88

National cups
 Piala Utama
 Champions: 1992
 Runners-up: 1990
 Piala Liga
 Runners-up (3): 1987, 1988, 1989

as Pelita Jaya U-21

League
Indonesia Super League U-21
 Champions: 2008–09
 Runners-up: 2009–10
 Third-placed: 2012

Continental
Asian Club Championship
 Third-place: 1990–91

Coaches

Note

Coaching staff

Source:

References

External links
  
 Madura United F.C. at Liga Indonesia
 

 
Sport in East Java
Football clubs in Indonesia
Football clubs in East Java
Association football clubs established in 2016
2016 establishments in Indonesia